Orthochilus ecristatus, or giant orchid, is a terrestrial species of orchid native to Cuba and to the southeastern United States (from Louisiana to North Carolina). It was previously known as Eulophia ecristata or Pteroglossaspis ecristata until recently transferred to the genus Orthochilus.  This is one of several species known as a "giant orchid".

References

External links 
US Department of Agriculture plants profile, Pteroglossaspis ecristata (Fernald) Rolfe giant orchid 
Florida Natural Areas Inventory, giant orchid, Pteroglossaspis ecristata
Florida Native and Naturalized Orchids, Giant Orchid, Non-crested Eulophia (Pteroglossaspis ecristata) 
North Carolina Native Plant Society
Ladi Bird Johnson Wildflower Center, University of Texas, Pteroglossaspis ecristata (Fernald) Rolfe Giant orchid

Eulophiinae
Flora of the Southeastern United States
Flora of Cuba
Plants described in 1897
Flora without expected TNC conservation status